"Sae Taryeong" (IPA pronunciation: [sɛː.tʰaː.ɾjŋ]) is a representative folk song (minyo) of the Jeolla-namdo region of Korea, that describes the sounds and physical descriptions of a variety of birds. The song uses onomatopoeia to describe bird calls from the parrot to the crane. The song was composed by Kim Sam-jin, and the song first attained popularity after it was published in the pansori repertory Jeokbyeokga by Yi Dong-baek. The song follows the Jungjungmori Jangdan beat, which is also used in pansori and sanjo. The melodic pattern that the song follows is yukjabaegitori, which is a collection of four pitches with gestures (sikimsae), which consists of a vibrating note (tteoneunum), a note with no vibrato (cheong), appoggiatura (kkeokneunnum), and a note that goes upward in pitch while vibrating (eotcheong). An alternate hanja name for the song is "Bijoga".

History 
"Saetaryeong" originated in the Jeolla-do region of Korea. The song first attained popularity after it was published in the pansori repertory Jeokbyeokga. It is suggested that it has been sung since the late Joseon period. Singers such as Lee Seok-sun (reign of Heonjong), Il-chi (reign of Cheoljong), Park Yu-jeon (reign of Cheoljong), and Yi Dong-baek (Japanese occupation) were said to have been good at performing the song.

Composition 
The song is divided into two parts. The first part is about the scene of spring when swallows fly, and the second about the appearance and sounds of birds. The first section is sung in a fast jungjungmori rhythm using a tong-tong rhythm with 15 beats in 3 minutes and 4 beats. The second section is sung in a slower jungmori rhythm. As "Saetaryeong" is a long song, it can take over nine minutes to sing. It is regarded as a highly developed minyo due to the difficult singing method.

Lyrics 
Source:

Gallery 
A gallery of the birds mentioned within the song.

See also 

 Arirang
 Birds of Korea
 Doraji Taryeong
 Jeokbyeokga
 Monggeumpo Taryeong
 Music of Korea
 Pansori

References 

Korean traditional music
Korean-language songs